Dr. Róisín Kennedy is an Irish art critic and curator.

Kennedy is a graduate of University College Dublin and of the University of Edinburgh. She was awarded an Arts Council Bursary in Curatorship by the Arts Council in 1998 for which she curated and catalogued the historic and contemporary state collection at Dublin Castle, and wrote Dublin Castle Art. (1999). She is former Yeats Curator at the National Gallery of Ireland, (2006–08), where she curated The Fantastic in Irish Art and Masquerade and Spectacle: The Travelling Fair in the Work of Jack B. Yeats in 2007.

Kennedy's research focuses on the critical contexts of modernist art in Ireland. She completed an IRCHSS funded PhD entitled  Politics of Vision: Critical Writing on Art in Ireland, 1939 -1972 in 2006. She has published widely on the subject in edited collections and in Circa, Irish Arts Review and Third Text.

References

Living people
Alumni of the University of Edinburgh
Alumni of University College Dublin
European art curators
Irish art critics
Irish women artists
Year of birth missing (living people)
Irish curators
Irish women critics
Irish women curators